Stadtcasino Basel is a concert hall in Basel, Switzerland.

It belongs to the Stadtcasino-Gesellschaft, a non-profit cultural association in Basel. It is the home of the Sinfonieorchester Basel.

History

The Casino-Gesellschaft first met in 1808; eventually the society required its own building, and the architect Melchior Berri worked on plans from 1820 to 1822. The original building, on a site between Barfüsserplatz and Steinenberg provided free by the government, was completed in 1826.  Notable events held in the original building include the First Zionist Congress in 1897.

In the late 1930s the present Stadtcasino was built on Steinenberg.

From 2000 there was a project to build a new Stadtcasino; although an international competition was held for architects, and a winner was announced, the voters of the canton of Basel-Stadt refused permission in 2007 to proceed with the new building. In 2010 it was proposed to make structural alterations and extensions to the existing building. This is being carried out from 2016 to 2019.

References

Concert halls in Switzerland
Buildings and structures in Basel